Ascanio Marchesini (died 1580) was a Roman Catholic prelate who served as Bishop of Calvi Risorta (1575–1580)
and Titular Bishop of Maioren (1567–1575).

Biography
On 18 April 1567, Ascanio Marchesini was appointed during the papacy of Pope Pius V as Titular Bishop of Maioren.
On 19 May 1567, he was consecrated bishop by Egidio Valenti, Bishop of Nepi e Sutri, with Thomas Goldwell, Bishop of Saint Asaph, and Giambattista Milanese, Bishop of Marsi, serving as co-consecrators. 
On 23 September 1575, he was appointed during the papacy of Pope Gregory XIII as Bishop of Calvi Risorta.
He served as Bishop of Calvi Risorta until his death in 1580.

References

External links and additional sources
 (for Chronology of Bishops) 
 (for Chronology of Bishops) 
 (for Chronology of Bishops) 

16th-century Italian Roman Catholic bishops
Bishops appointed by Pope Pius V
Bishops appointed by Pope Gregory XIII
1580 deaths